Independence High School is a 9–12 public high school in Thompson's Station, Tennessee. It is one of several high schools in the Williamson County Schools district.

History
The school opened in 2004, initially with only a freshman and sophomore class. The junior class was added in the second year and the senior class in the third. The first class of seniors graduated on May 26, 2007. The second class, which was the first to complete all 4 years at Independence, graduated May 24, 2008. The school once had approximately 2000 students, but after the creation of nearby high schools, student enrollment has decreased significantly.

Administration
Marilyn Webb was the first principal of Independence High from 2004 to 2008. She was replaced by Todd Campbell the summer of 2008. Campbell resigned in May 2016 and Niki Patton was named the new principal later that month.

Athletics

TSSAA-sanctioned sports 
The below TSSAA-sanctioned teams have won a combined 3 state championships.

 Baseball
 Boys' basketball
 Girls' basketball
 Bowling
 Boys' cross country
 Girls' cross country
 Football: 2015
 Boys' golf
 Girls' golf: 2005
 Boys' soccer
 Girls' soccer
 Softball
 Boys' tennis
 Girls' tennis
 Boys' track
 Girls' track
 Volleyball: 2008
 Wrestling

Club sports 
Additionally, IHS competes in several non-TSSAA club sports: hockey, ultimate frisbee, lacrosse, rugby, and swimming. Several of these club sports are joint ventures with other nearby schools.

Activities

Forensics
The speech and debate team is in both the National Forensic League and the Tennessee High School Speech and Drama League. They compete throughout Tennessee and consistently place in the State Championship tournament in a variety of events. The team successfully qualified students for the National Forensic League national competition in both 2009 and 2011. Independence Debate made its debut on the national debate circuit in January 2012 at Emory University's Barkley Forum.

Notable people
Luke Benward — actor
Rashaan Gaulden — NFL defensive back
Robert Hassell - MLB baseball player

References

External links 
Independence High School
Independence Marching Band
Independence Debate Team

Schools in Williamson County, Tennessee
Public high schools in Tennessee
Educational institutions established in 2004
2004 establishments in Tennessee